Neocollyris panfilovi is a species of ground beetle in the genus Neocollyris in the family Carabidae. It was described by Naviaux and Matalin in 2002.

References

Panfilovi, Neocollyris
Beetles described in 2002